Rafael Francisco Santana de la Cruz (born January 31, 1958) is a former Major League Baseball shortstop who won a World Series ring with the 1986 New York Mets. He currently serves as the Dominican Republic scouting and player development supervisor for the Chicago White Sox.

St. Louis Cardinals
The Cardinals sent pitcher George Frazier to the Yankees in June to complete the deal.

In 30 games, Santana had only three hits in fourteen at-bats for a .214 batting average to go along with two runs batted in.

New York Mets
Santana was released by the Cardinals on January 17, and signed that same day with the New York Mets. During the 1984 season, he played 51 games for the Mets, hitting a career-best .271 with a home run and 12 RBIs as the primary back-up for starting shortstop Jose Oquendo.

He responded with a .257 batting average and a .965 fielding percentage for the squad that finished with 98 wins, and three games behind the Cards in the National League East.

During the  regular season, he batted just .218 with a home run and 28 RBIs, however, batting eighth in the order, he also led the squad with twelve intentional walks (Mets pitchers batted only .123 for the season). Santana started all 13 games for the Mets during the  post-season, and established an NLCS record for most putouts (13), assists (18) and chances accepted (31) by a shortstop in a six-game series against the Houston Astros.

After the  campaign where he set career-highs in home runs (5) and RBIs (44) with the Mets, Santana was traded to the cross-town Yankees with Victor Garcia for Steve Frey, Phil Lombardi and Darren Reed. After missing the entire  season with an elbow injury, Santana was released on November 7 of that year.

Cleveland Indians
In January 1990, Santana signed with the Cleveland Indians, where he played 7 games and was reunited with 1986 Mets teammates Keith Hernandez, Jesse Orosco, and Stan Jefferson. After being released on April 25 of that year, he retired from the big leagues at the age of 32.

Coaching career
After his playing career, Santana made a seamless foray into coaching. He started by managing Azucareros del Este of the Dominican Winter League from  through . His first coaching job in the United States was also in 1992, with the Kansas City Royals' Florida State League affiliate, the Baseball City Royals (located in Davenport, Florida). He spent four seasons in the Royals' organization, also coaching with the Carolina League's Wilmington Blue Rocks, the Northwest League's Eugene Emeralds and the Midwest League's Springfield Sultans.

On January 1, Rafael Santana was named manager of the Winston-Salem Warthogs, his first managerial job in the United States. The following season, Santana took over the Birmingham Barons from Chris Cron. He currently serves as the Dominican Republic scouting and player development supervisor for the White Sox.

Personal life
He is a member of the Mets Alumni Association and along with past Mets players, still makes personal appearances on behalf of the team. On August 19, 2006, Santana attended a 20th Anniversary Reunion of the 1986 Mets World Series Championship Team at Shea Stadium in Flushing, New York, which took place prior to that night's game between the Mets and the Colorado Rockies.

Santana and his wife, Gloria, live in Cape Coral, Florida, and have three children: Audry, Alexander, and Dhayan. Alexander is a third baseman who attended Mariner High School in the Cape and was drafted by the Los Angeles Dodgers in the 2nd round of the 2011 MLB draft.

References

External links

1958 births
Living people
Arkansas Travelers players
Birmingham Barons managers
Chicago White Sox coaches
Cleveland Indians players
Dominican Republic baseball coaches
Dominican Republic expatriate baseball players in the United States
Fort Lauderdale Yankees players

Louisville Redbirds players
Major League Baseball first base coaches
Major League Baseball players from the Dominican Republic
Major League Baseball shortstops
Nashville Sounds players
New York Mets players
New York Yankees players
Oneonta Yankees players
People from Cape Coral, Florida
People from La Romana, Dominican Republic
Springfield Redbirds players
St. Louis Cardinals players
Tidewater Tides players